Penicillium infra-aurantiacum is a species of the genus of Penicillium.

References

infra-aurantiacum
Fungi described in 2014